Pyrops spinolae is a species of planthopper sometimes referred-to as the dark-horned lantern-fly (Vietnamese: ve sầu đầu đen). The species is named after Maximilian Spinola, the authority for the genus.

This lantern bug is recorded from India and Indochina.  Previous references to two subspecies: P. spinolae condorinus (Lallemand, 1960) and P. s. spinolae (Westwood, 1842) appear to be invalid.

References

spinolae
Insects of Vietnam
Insects described in 1842
Taxa named by John O. Westwood